Helle Simonsen (born 7 September 1984 in Hvidovre) is a Danish curler.

Career
In 2001, she represented Denmark for the first time, playing third for Denise Dupont. The team qualified for the 2001 World Junior Curling Championships, where they finished 9th. They did not manage to qualify again until the 2004 World Junior Curling Championships, when Simonsen played second for the rink (now skipped by Madeleine Dupont. Denmark finished 6th. That same year, they represented Denmark at the 2004 Ford World Women's Curling Championship where they placed 8th and the 2004 European Curling Championships where they placed 8th as well.

Simonsen would then join up with Nielsen. She found some success with her new rink, winning bronze medals at the 2006 World Junior Curling Championships and the 2007 European Curling Championships. They did not return to an international event until 2010 when they finished in 5th at the 2010 European Curling Championships. They represented Denmark at the 2011 Capital One World Women's Curling Championship where they played in their home country.

In February 2016, it was announced that Simonsen, who suffers from polycystic ovary syndrome, had tested positive for banned substances (5aAdiol and 5bAdiol) she took as a hormonal remedy as a pregnancy aid. As a result, she did not play with her team at the 2016 Ford World Women's Curling Championship. She was ultimately given a 15 month ban, beginning from the date she tested positive in February 2016.

References

External links
 

Living people
1984 births
Danish female curlers
Curlers at the 2014 Winter Olympics
Olympic curlers of Denmark
Doping cases in curling
Danish sportspeople in doping cases
People from Hvidovre Municipality
Sportspeople from the Capital Region of Denmark
21st-century Danish women